Dialeucias variegata is a moth of the family Erebidae first described by Paul Dognin in 1923. It is found in French Guiana.

References

Phaegopterina
Moths described in 1923